Hans-Georg Wenzel (3 February, 1945 – 11 November, 1999), also known as George Wenzel, was a German geodesist, geophysicist and university lecturer. His most important field of work was physical geodesy, where he worked after his dissertation on earth tides with geophysical measurements up to global models of the earth gravity field.

Life and career 
Hans-Georg Wenzel was born on 3 February 1945 in Hahnenklee-Bockswiese. From 1962 to 1964 Wenzel trained as a surveying technician. Until 1967 he studied surveying at the Staatliche Ingenieurschule für Bauwesen in Essen and at the Technische Hochschule Hannover, which he graduated in 1972 with a Dipl.-Ing. degree. He then worked at the Institute for Geodesy at Leibniz University Hannover, first as a scientific assistant, later as a scientific assistant, chief engineer and finally as an academic councilor. In 1985 he habilitated with his thesis "High Resolution Spherical Harmonic Models for the Gravitational Potential of the Earth" (Hochauflösende Kugelfunktionsmodelle für das Gravitationspotential der Erde). In 1988 he was appointed Professor of Gravimetry and Geodynamics at the Geodetic Institute of the University of Karlsruhe and Director of the Geophysical Observatory in Schiltach in the Black Forest. Since 1987, Wenzel has been a member of the board of the International Association of Geodesy (IAG), whose sections he chaired from 1991 to 1995 and from 1995 to 1999 as president of the Earth Tide Commission (ETC) of the IAG. On 1 March, 1999, Wenzel was appointed to succeed  as professor at the University of Hannover. Shortly after his appointment he left life unexpectedly in November 1999 in Wennigsen.

Honours 
For many years Wenzel was well known in geodesy, especially for his groundbreaking spherical harmonic models. They made an important contribution to geophysics and geodynamics, but also to regional and global geoid determination. In his research career, Wenzel published more than 150 publications on global tidal research, gravity field research and geodynamics. In May 2000, the Earth Tide Commission awarded Hans-Georg Wenzel the ETC Medal Award posthumously.

Selected Publication 

 
  (Report on the results of the SEASAT-A-Nordsee-Projekt excursion).
  
 
 
 .

Editorials

References

Sources 
 

1945 births
1999 deaths
Scientists from Lower Saxony
German geodesists
People from Goslar (district)
Academic staff of the University of Hanover